Herman Miller, officially MillerKnoll, Inc., is an American company that produces office furniture, equipment, and home furnishings, including the Aeron chair, Noguchi table, Marshmallow sofa, Mirra chair, and the Eames Lounge Chair.  Herman Miller is also credited with the 1968 invention of the office cubicle (originally known as the "Action Office") under then-director of research Robert Propst.

History
Herman Miller was founded in 1905 as the Star Furniture Co. Initially the company produced furniture, especially bedroom suites, in historic revival styles. In 1919, it was renamed the Michigan Star Furniture Co. under then-president Dirk Jan De Pree. De Pree and his father-in-law, Herman Miller, purchased 51% of the company stock in 1923 and renamed it the Herman Miller Furniture Company. The company reformed as Herman Miller, Inc. in 1960.

With the coming of the Great Depression, the company faced bankruptcy until De Pree met Gilbert Rohde, an up-and-coming modernist designer. Rohde convinced De Pree that the furniture industry's focus on historical reproduction furniture in lieu of new designs was not only out of touch with the consumer, but fundamentally dishonest in the practices used to make furniture pieces appear older and of higher quality than they were. De Pree acquired the rights to Rohde's modernist furniture designs in exchange for a 3 percent royalty on any furniture sold. In 1933, Herman Miller debuted a line of modern furniture at the Century of Progress exposition in Chicago, Illinois. In 1941, the company opened a showroom in the Merchandise Mart in Chicago, and another in New York City. Under Rohde's supervision, Herman Miller entered the contract office furniture market in 1942, with the introduction of the "Modular Executive Office" Group (EOG).

Rohde died in 1944 and was replaced by architect George Nelson, who joined the firm as director of design in 1945. Over the next four decades Nelson influenced Herman Miller through both his personal designs and the designers that he recruited, including Isamu Noguchi, Charles and Ray Eames, and textile designer Alexander Girard. Beginning in the late 1940s, the period under Nelson's guidance saw Herman Miller produce some of the company's most recognizable pieces of furniture, including the Noguchi table, Eames Lounge Chair, Marshmallow sofa, Ball clock (actually produced by Howard Miller Clock Company), and the Sling sofa.

De Pree continued to serve as Herman Miller CEO until 1961, when he was forced by illness to step down. He was succeeded by his son, Hugh De Pree, who served as CEO until the mid-1980s. Hugh De Pree was succeeded by his brother Max De Pree, who held the position until 1990.

In 1961, Herman Miller set up the Herman Miller Research Division, based in Ann Arbor, Michigan. This division developed the "Action Office" line in 1964 under the supervision of Robert Propst and with the design assistance of George Nelson's New York design studio. Though the initial line, known as "Action Office I", was not a success, it led Propst to develop the "Action Office II" line, which introduced the office cubicle. In 1978, Action Office II was renamed simply "Action Office". Herman Miller's line of Action Office products generated sales of over $5 billion .

George Nelson's influence at Herman Miller gradually declined during the 1970s as new designers joined the company, including Don Chadwick and Bill Stumpf, who in the 1990s developed the highly-successful Aeron chair. In 1981, Herman Miller started to work with the Italian designer Clino T. Castelli on the process of designing physical environments, a so-called Design Primario. Designer Tom Newhouse introduced the "Newhouse Group" of free-standing furniture in 1987, and assisted with the "Ethospace" wall panel system for the Action Office line. Ray Wilkes designed the "Modular Seating Group", popularly known as the Chicklet Chairs.

In 2010, the firm acquired Colebrook Bosson Saunders, a designer and manufacturer of ergonomic furniture.

The acquisition of Knoll by Herman Miller was announced in April 2021 in a $1.8 billion deal. The acquisition closed July 19, 2021.

In July 2021, the company rebranded as MillerKnoll.

Brands
In addition to Herman Miller and Knoll, the company owns notable brands including Design Within Reach, Colebrook Bosson Saunders, Dates Weiser, Edelman Leather,  Holly Hunt, Hay, Maharam, and Muuto.

Workplace
According to CNN Money, Herman Miller was ranked as the second most admired company in the Home Equipment, Furnishing division.

In March 2008, Herman Miller settled an antitrust lawsuit with the states of New York, Michigan, and Illinois for $750,000.  The lawsuit focused on Herman Miller's use of a suggested retail pricing policy.

Sustainability
Herman Miller has engaged in a number of initiatives to promote sustainability. The company has developed a technique of mixing sawdust with chicken manure to produce topsoil. Management of the company has expressed concerns about global warming, and the company was using 27% renewable energy .

Herman Miller calls its driving sustainability initiative "Perfect Vision" and it put the strategy in place in 2004. These targets include zero landfill disposal, zero hazardous waste generation, zero air emissions (VOCs), zero process water discharge, 100% green electrical energy use, company buildings constructed to a minimum LEED Silver certification, and 100% of sales from DfE-approved products.

Herman Miller helped fund the start of the United States Green Building Council, and hired architect William McDonough + Partners to design a factory incorporating green design principles.  The building is known as the "Greenhouse", and is an example of green building. The building won the following awards:
AIA Committee on the Environment Top Ten Environmental Buildings, 1997
Business Week/Architectural Record Good Design Is Good Business Award, 1997
AIA Central Virginia Honor Award, 1998
International Development Research Council, Award for Distinguished Service in Environmental Planning, 1995

Notable products

Seating
Eames Lounge Chair Wood (1946) – designed by Charles and Ray Eames
Marshmallow sofa (1954) – designed by Irving Harper
Eames Lounge Chair and Ottoman (1956) – designed by Charles and Ray Eames
Eames Aluminum Group Chairs (1958) – designed by Charles and Ray Eames
Eames Airport Seating – tandem sling seating found in Dulles and O'Hare and many other airports (1962), designed by Charles and Ray Eames
Equa 2 (1984) – designed by Bill Stumpf and Don Chadwick
Aeron Chair (1987) – designed by Bill Stumpf and Don Chadwick
Ergon 3 (1995) – designed by Bill Stumpf
Mirra 1 (2003) – designed by Studio 7.5
Celle (2005) – designed by Jerome Caruso
Embody (2008) – designed by Bill Stumpf and Jeff Weber
Setu (2009) – designed by Studio 7.5
Sayl (2010) – designed by Yves Behar
Mirra 2 (2013) – designed by Studio 7.5
Cosm (2018) – designed by Studio 7.5
Keyn Chair Group (2018) – designed by forpeople
Vantum (2022) - Collaboration with Logitech G

Tables/desks
Noguchi table (1948) – designed by Isamu Noguchi

The Burdick Group modular desk system (1980) - designed by Bruce Burdick

References

External links

 The Herman Miller Consortium Collection at Wayne State University Library is a historic, digital, product collection originally accumulated as part of Herman Miller's corporate archives in a digitized, searchable format.
 CNN'.com: "Cubicles: The great mistake"
 Youtube.com: "Comments on Herman Miller" — by designer Yves Béhar
 "Herman Miller Embody Office Chair Review", The Tech Reviewer

Furniture companies of the United States
Design companies of the United States
Industrial design firms
Companies listed on the Nasdaq
Companies based in Stamford, Connecticut
Companies based in Fairfield County, Connecticut
Companies based in Connecticut